Böhning is a German-language surname. Notable people with the surname include:

Björn Böhning (born 1978), German politician
Hans Böhning (1893–1934), German World War I flying ace

References

German-language surnames
German patronymic surnames